A cleanroom or clean room is an engineered space, which maintains a very low concentration of airborne particulates. It is well isolated, well-controlled from contamination, and actively cleansed. Such rooms are commonly needed for scientific research, and in industrial production for all nanoscale processes, such as semiconductor manufacturing. A cleanroom is designed to keep everything from dust, to airborne organisms, or vaporised particles, away from it, and so from whatever material is being handled inside it.

A cleanroom can also prevent the escape of materials. This is often the primary aim in hazardous biology and nuclear work, in pharmaceutics and in virology.

Cleanrooms typically come with a cleanliness level quantified by the number of particles per cubic meter at a predetermined molecule measure. The ambient outdoor air in a typical urban area contains 35,000,000 particles for each cubic meter in the size range 0.5 μm and bigger, equivalent to an ISO 9 certified cleanroom. By comparison an ISO 14644-1 level 1 certified cleanroom permits no particles in that size range, and just 12 particles for each cubic meter of 0.3 μm and smaller. Semiconductor facilities often get by with level 7 or 5, while level 1 facilities are exceedingly rare.

History
The modern cleanroom was invented by American physicist Willis Whitfield. As employee of the Sandia National Laboratories, Whitfield created the initial plans for the cleanroom in 1960. Prior to Whitfield's invention, earlier cleanrooms often had problems with particles and unpredictable airflows. Whitfield designed his cleanroom with a constant, highly filtered air flow to flush out impurities. Within a few years of its invention in the 1960s, Whitfield's modern cleanroom had generated more than US$50 billion in sales worldwide (approximately $ billion today).

The majority of the integrated circuit manufacturing facilities in Silicon Valley were made by three companies: MicroAire, PureAire, and Key Plastics. These competitors made laminar flow units, glove boxes, clean rooms and air showers, along with the chemical tanks and benches used in the 'Wet Process' building of integrated circuits. These three companies were the pioneers of the use of Teflon for airguns, chemical pumps, scrubbers, water guns, and other devices needed for the production of integrated circuits. William (Bill) C. McElroy Jr. worked as engineering manager, drafting room supervisor, QA/QC, and designer for all three companies and his designs added 45 original patents to the technology of the time. McElroy also wrote a four-page article for MicroContamination Journal, wet processing training manuals, and equipment manuals for wet processing and clean rooms.

Overview
A clean room is a necessity in semiconductor manufacturing, rechargeable battery industry, the life sciences, and any other field that is highly sensitive to environmental contamination.

Cleanrooms can range from the very small to the very large. On the one hand, a single user laboratory can be built to cleanroom standards within several square meters, and on the other entire manufacturing facilities can be contained within a cleanroom with factory floors covering thousands of square meters. Between the large and the small, there are also modular cleanrooms. They have been argued to lower costs of scaling the technology, and to be less susceptible to catastrophic failure.

With such a wide area of application, not every cleanroom is the same. For example, the rooms utilized in semiconductor manufacturing need not be sterile (i.e., free of uncontrolled microbes);, while the ones used in biotechnology usually must be. Vice versa, operating rooms need not be absolutely pure of nanoscale inorganic salts, such as rust, while nanotechnology absolutely requires it. What then is common to all cleanrooms is strict control of airborne particulates, possibly with secondary decontamination of air, surfaces, workers entering the room, implements, chemicals, and machinery.

Sometimes particulates exiting the compartment are also of concern, such as in research into dangerous viruses, or where radioactive materials are being handled.

Basic construction 

First, outside air entering a cleanroom is filtered and cooled by several outdoor air handlers using progressively finer filters to exclude dust.

Within, air is constantly recirculated through fan units containing high-efficiency particulate absorbing filters (HEPA), and/or ultra-low particulate air (ULPA) filters to remove internally generated contaminants. Special lighting fixtures, walls, equipment and other materials are used to minimize the generation of airborne particles. Plastic sheets can be used to restrict air turbulence, if the cleanroom design is of the laminar airflow type.

Air temperature and humidity levels inside a cleanroom are tightly controlled, because they affect the efficiency and means of air filtration. If a particular room requires low enough humidity to make static electricity a concern, it too will be controlled by e.g. introducing controlled amounts of charged ions into the air, using a corona discharge. Static discharge is of particular concern in the electronics industry, where it can instantly destroy components and circuitry.

Equipment inside any cleanroom is designed to generate minimal air contamination. The selection of material for the construction of a cleanroom should not generate any particulates, hence monolithic epoxy or polyurethane floor coating is preferred. Buffed stainless steel or powder-coated mild steel sandwich partition panels and ceiling panel are used, instead of iron alloys prone to rusting and then flaking. Corners like the wall to wall, wall to floor, wall to ceiling are avoided by providing coved surface and all joints need to be sealed with epoxy sealant to avoid any deposition or generation of particles at the joints, by vibration and friction.

Air flow principles 

Cleanrooms maintain particulate-free air through the use of either HEPA or ULPA filters employing laminar or turbulent air flow principles. Laminar, or unidirectional, air flow systems direct filtered air downward or in horizontal direction in a constant stream towards filters located on walls near the cleanroom floor or through raised perforated floor panels to be recirculated. Laminar air flow systems are typically employed across 80% of a cleanroom ceiling to maintain constant air processing. Stainless steel or other non shedding materials are used to construct laminar air flow filters and hoods to prevent excess particles entering the air. Turbulent, or non unidirectional, air flow uses both laminar air flow hoods and nonspecific velocity filters to keep air in a cleanroom in constant motion, although not all in the same direction. The rough air seeks to trap particles that may be in the air and drive them towards the floor, where they enter filters and leave the cleanroom environment. US FDA and EU have laid down guidelines and limit for microbial contamination which is very stringent to ensure freedom from microbial contamination in pharmaceutical products. Plenums between air handlers and fan filter units along with sticky mats may also be used.

In addition to air filters, clean rooms can also use ultraviolet light to disinfect the air. UV devices can be fitted into ceiling light fixtures and irradiate air, killing potentially infectious particulates, including 99.99 percent of airborne microbial and fungal contaminants. UV light has previously been used to clean surface contaminants in sterile environments such as hospital operating rooms. Their use in other clean rooms may increase as equipment becomes more affordable. Potential advantages of UV-based decontamination includes a reduced reliance on chemical disinfectants and the extension of HVAC filter life.

Cleanrooms of different kinds 

Some cleanrooms are kept at a positive pressure so if any leaks occur, air leaks out of the chamber instead of unfiltered air coming in. This is most typically the case in semiconductor manufacturing, where even minute amounts of particulates leaking in could contaminate the whole process, while anything leaking out would not be harmful to the surrounding community. The opposite is done e.g. in the case of high level bio-laboratories that handle dangerous bacteria or viruses; those are always held at negative pressure, with the exhaust being passed through high efficiency filters, and further sterilizing procedures. Both are still cleanrooms, because the particulate level inside is maintained within very low limits.

Some cleanroom HVAC systems control the humidity to such low levels that extra equipment like air ionizers are required to prevent electrostatic discharge problems. This is a particular concern within the semiconductor business, because static discharge can easily damage modern circuit designs. On the other hand, active ions in the air can harm exposed components as well. Because of this most workers in high electronics and semiconductor facilities have to wear conductive boots while working. Low-level cleanrooms may only require special shoes, with completely smooth soles that do not track in dust or dirt. However, for safety reasons, shoe soles must not create slipping hazards. Access to a cleanroom is usually restricted to those wearing a cleanroom suit, including the necessary machinery.

In cleanrooms in which the standards of air contamination are less rigorous, the entrance to the cleanroom may not have an air shower. An anteroom (known as a "gray room") is used to put on clean-room clothing. This practice is common e.g. in many nuclear power plants, which operate as low-grade inverse pressure cleanrooms, as a whole.

Recirculating vs. One pass cleanrooms

Recirculating cleanrooms return air to the negative pressure plenum via low wall air returns. The air then is pulled by HEPA fan filter units back into the cleanroom. The air is constantly recirculating and by continuously passing through HEPA filtration removing particles from the air each time. Another advantage of this design is that air conditioning can be incorporated.

One pass cleanrooms draw air from outside the cleanroom, pass it through HEPA fan filter units into the cleanroom. The air then leaves through exhaust grills to outside the cleanroom. The advantage of this approach is the lower cost. The disadvantages are comparatively shorter HEPA fan filter life, worse particle counts than a recirculating cleanroom, and that it cannot accommodate air conditioning.

Operating procedure 

In order to minimize the carrying of particulate by a person moving into the cleanroom, staff enter and leave through airlocks (sometimes including an air shower stage), and wear protective clothing such as hoods, face masks, gloves, boots, and coveralls. 

Common materials such as paper, pencils, and fabrics made from natural fibers are often excluded, because they shed particulates in use.

Particle levels are usually tested using a particle counter and microorganisms detected and counted through environmental monitoring methods. Polymer tools used in cleanrooms must be carefully determined to be chemically compatible with cleanroom processing fluids  as well as ensured to generate a low level of particle generation.

When cleaning, only special mops and buckets are used. Cleaning chemicals used tend to involve sticky elements to trap dust, and may need a second step with light molecular weight solvents to clear. Cleanroom furniture is designed beforehand to produce a minimum of particles, and is easy to clean.

A cleanroom is as much a process and a meticulous culture to maintain, as it is a space as such.

Personnel contamination of cleanrooms

The greatest threat to cleanroom contamination comes from the users themselves. In the healthcare and pharmaceutical sectors, control of microorganisms is important, especially microorganisms likely to be deposited into the air stream from skin shedding. Studying cleanroom microflora is of importance for microbiologists and quality control personnel to assess changes in trends. Shifts in the types of microflora may indicate deviations from the "norm" such as resistant strains or problems with cleaning practices.

In assessing cleanroom micro-organisms, the typical flora are primarily those associated with human skin (Gram-positive cocci), although microorganisms from other sources such as the environment (Gram-positive rods) and water (Gram-negative rods) are also detected, although in lower number. Common bacterial genera include Micrococcus, Staphylococcus, Corynebacterium, and Bacillus, and fungal genera include Aspergillus and Penicillium.

Cleanroom classification and standardization 

Cleanrooms are classified according to the number and size of particles permitted per volume of air. Large numbers like "class 100" or "class 1000" refer to FED-STD-209E, and denote the number of particles of size 0.5 μm or larger permitted per cubic foot of air. The standard also allows interpolation; for example SNOLAB is maintained as a class 2000 cleanroom.

A discrete, light-scattering airborne particle counter is used to determine the concentration of airborne particles, equal to and larger than the specified sizes, at designated sampling locations.

Small numbers refer to ISO 14644-1 standards, which specify the decimal logarithm of the number of particles 0.1 μm or larger permitted per m3 of air. So, for example, an ISO class 5 cleanroom has at most 105 particles/m3.

Both FS 209E and ISO 14644-1 assume log-log relationships between particle size and particle concentration. For that reason, zero particle concentration does not exist. Some classes do not require testing some particle sizes, because the concentration is too low or too high to be practical to test for, but such blanks should not be read as zero.

Because 1 m3 is about 35 ft3, the two standards are mostly equivalent when measuring 0.5 μm particles, although the testing standards differ. Ordinary room air is around class 1,000,000 or ISO 9.

ISO 14644-1 and ISO 14698 
ISO 14644-1 and ISO 14698 are non-governmental standards developed by the International Organization for Standardization (ISO). The former applies to clean rooms in general (see table below); the latter to cleanrooms where biocontamination may be an issue. Since the strictest standards have been achieved only for space applications, it is sometimes difficult to know whether they were achieved in vacuum or standard conditions.

ISO 14644-1 defines the maximum concentration of particles per class and per particle size with the following formula

Where  is the maximum concentration of particles in a volume of 1m of airborne particles that are equal to, or larger, than the considered particle size which is rounded to the nearest whole number, using no more than three significant figures,  is the ISO class number,  is the size of the particle in m and 0.1 is a constant expressed in m. The result for standard particle sizes is expressed in the following table.

US FED STD 209E
US FED-STD-209E was a United States federal standard. It was officially cancelled by the General Services Administration on November 29, 2001, but is still widely used.

Current regulating bodies include: ISO, USP 800, US FED STD 209E (previous standard, still used)

 Drug Quality and Security Act (DQSA) created in Nov. 2013 in response to drug compounding deaths and serious adverse events. 
 The Federal Food, Drug, and Cosmetic Act (FD&C Act) created specific guidelines and policies for human compounding.
 503A addresses compounding by state or federally licensed facility by licensed personnel (pharmacist/ physicians)
 503B pertaining to outsourcing facilities need direct supervision from a licensed pharmacist and do not need to be a licensed pharmacy. Facility is licensed through the Food and Drug Administration (FDA)

EU GMP classification
EU GMP guidelines are more stringent than others, requiring cleanrooms to meet particle counts at operation (during manufacturing process) and at rest (when manufacturing process is not carried out, but room AHU is on).

BS 5295
BS 5295 is a British Standard.

BS 5295 Class 1 also requires that the greatest particle present in any sample can not exceed 5 μm. BS 5295 has been superseded, withdrawn since the year 2007 and replaced with "BS EN ISO 14644-6:2007".

USP <800> Standards 
USP 800 is a United States standard developed by the United States Pharmacopeial Convention (USP) with an effective date of December 1, 2019.

Ramifications and further applications 

In hospitals, theatres are similar to cleanrooms for surgical patients' operations with incisions to prevent any infections for the patient.

In another case, severely immunocompromised patients sometimes have to be held in prolonged isolation from their surroundings, for fear of infection. At the extreme, this necessitates a cleanroom environment. The same is the case for patients carrying airborne infectious diseases, only they are handled at negative, not positive pressure.

In exobiology when we seek out contact with other planets, there is a biological hazard both ways: we must not contaminate any sample return missions from other stellar bodies with terrestrial microbes, and we must not contaminate possible other ecosystems existing in other planets. Thus, even by international law, any probes we send to outer space must be sterile, and so to be handled in cleanroom conditions.

Since larger cleanrooms are very sensitive controlled environments, within which multibillion dollar industry can take place, sometimes they are even fitted with numerous seismic base isolation systems to prevent costly equipment malfunction.

See also

 Air ionizer
 Air quality index
 Contamination control
 Data recovery lab
 Microfiltration
 Pressure room (disambiguation)
 Particle counter
 Pneumatic filter
 Secure environment
 Semiconductor device fabrication

References

External links

Cleanroom Wiki--The Global Society For Contamination Control (GSFCC)
The Secretariat to ISO/TC 209 Cleanrooms and associated controlled environments, the group of experts who negotiate all aspects of the 14644 standard

 
Rooms
Semiconductor device fabrication
Filters
Telecommunications engineering